Promise City is a city in Wayne County, Iowa, United States. The population was 88 at the time of the 2020 census.

Geography
Promise City is located at  (40.746955, -93.148953).

Demographics

2010 census
At the 2010 census, there were 111 people, 49 households and 29 families living in the city. The racial makeup of the city was 97.3% White, 1.8% Asian, and 0.9% from other races. Hispanic or Latino of any race were 0.9% of the population.

There were 49 households, of which 16.3% had children under the age of 18 living with them, 51.0% were married couples living together, 6.1% had a female householder with no husband present, 2.0% had a male householder with no wife present, and 40.8% were non-families. 32.7% of all households were made up of individuals, and 16.4% had someone living alone who was 65 years of age or older. The average household size was 2.27 and the average family size was 3.00.

The median age was 46.1 years. 17.1% of residents were under the age of 18; 8.1% were between the ages of 18 and 24; 20.7% were from 25 to 44; 31.5% were from 45 to 64; and 22.5% were 65 years of age or older. The population was 55.9% male and 44.1% female.

2000 census
At the 2000 census, there were 105 people, 50 households and 29 families living in the city. The racial makeup of the city was 99.05% White, and 0.95% from two or more races. Hispanic or Latino of any race were 0.95% of the population.

There were 50 households, of which 24.0% had children under the age of 18 living with them, 50.0% were married couples living together, 4.0% had a female householder with no husband present, and 42.0% were non-families. 38.0% of all households were made up of individuals, and 22.0% had someone living alone who was 65 years of age or older. The average household size was 2.10 and the average family size was 2.69.

19.0% of the population were under the age of 18, 3.8% from 18 to 24, 27.6% from 25 to 44, 25.7% from 45 to 64, and 23.8% who were 65 years of age or older. The median age was 43 years. For every 100 females, there were 94.4 males. For every 100 females age 18 and over, there were 88.9 males.

The median household income was $17,917 and the median family income was $25,000. Males had a median income of $19,000 compared with $18,750 for females. The per capita income was $10,637. There were 23.1% of families and 19.8% of the population living below the poverty line, including no under eighteens and 13.8% of those over 64.

Education
The Seymour Community School District operates local area public schools.

References

Cities in Wayne County, Iowa
Cities in Iowa